Omniglypta is a monotypic genus of molluscs belonging to the monotypic family Omniglyptidae. The only species is Omniglypta cerina.

The species is found in Japan.

References

Scaphopods
Monotypic mollusc genera